The Asian Football Confederation (AFC) section of 2010 FIFA World Cup qualification was allocated four assured qualifying berths for the final tournament in South Africa and one place in a play-off. 43 teams were in the running for these spots, while Laos, Brunei and the Philippines did not enter qualification. This was the first time Timor-Leste competed in World Cup qualification and the first time Australia attempted to qualify for the World Cup as a member of the AFC, having moved from the Oceania Football Confederation at the start of 2006. Note that this edition saw the first effective participation of Myanmar. The country, called "Burma" until 1989, was registered three times (1950, 1994, 2002) but withdrew each time before playing.

Asia's four automatic qualifying berths were taken by Australia, Japan and both North and South Korea. Bahrain failed to become a fifth Asian representative in the World Cup after losing the play-off match against Oceanian representatives New Zealand.

Seeding 
The initial seeding (used in the draw for the first two rounds) was based on each team's performance during the qualification stage for the previous World Cup. The admission of Australia to the AFC complicated matters slightly (as they had not taken part in the previous AFC qualification cycle, but had progressed to the World Cup finals in Germany – and had advanced further than the AFC qualifiers).

Initially, the AFC placed Australia as the first seed even though this contradicted the letter of the seeding – past practice (such as adopted by the AFC in the draw for the qualification to the 2008 Olympic Football Tournament) would have seeded Australia last.

By the time of the main qualification draw in Durban (which included the AFC third round), the seeding had been adjusted to rank the top 5 AFC nations according to their performance in the World Cup Final Tournament (of 2006). This resulted in minor changes to the seeding at that point.

Seeding for the first two rounds 
Teams ranked 1–5 received a bye from the first two knockout rounds and are entered into the third round.
Teams ranked 6–43 entered at the first round, with teams ranked from 6–24 drawn against teams ranked from 25 to 43.
Of the first round winners, the eight lowest remaining seeds would go on to play in the second round. The other teams would receive a bye to the third round.

 Guam and Bhutan withdrew after the draw, but before playing any matches.

First round 

The official draw took place on 6 August 2007 at the AFC House in Kuala Lumpur, Malaysia. Teams from Pot A were randomly paired with a team from Pot B.

|}

 For security reasons, Iraq played their home leg in Syria,  Palestine played their home leg in Qatar and Afghanistan played their home leg in Tajikistan.
 Bhutan withdrew.
 Guam withdrew.
 FIFA decided to move Myanmar home match to Malaysia.
 Timor-Leste elected to play their home leg in Indonesia.
 Palestine failed to appear; Singapore was awarded a 3–0 win. The Palestine Football Federation appealed to have the match rescheduled on the grounds that its players did not receive permits to leave the Gaza Strip, but FIFA dismissed the appeal.

Second round

Of the nineteen teams that progressed from the first round, the eight lowest seeded teams by FIFA rankings were required to play in the second round (the other eleven teams received a bye to the third round). As with the first round the draw took place on 6 August 2007 at AFC House in Kuala Lumpur, Malaysia.

As the teams involved were not known at the time, the draw placed teams ranked 16–19 against teams ranked 12–15.  The ties drawn were
 17th against 14th
 16th against 12th
 18th against 13th
 19th against 15th

|}

Third round 

The top 5 seeds were joined by the eleven highest-ranked winners from the first round and the four second round winners.

Qualified teams 

1 On 30 October 2007, the Kuwait Football Association was suspended from international football competitions by FIFA. On 9 November 2007, Kuwait was conditionally reinstated to international football competitions by FIFA.

Seeding 
These 20 teams were drawn into five groups of four teams at the main group draw in Durban, South Africa on 25 November 2007. The seeding for the main draw was the same for the first two rounds, with the exception that the five seeded nations (those that qualified for the 2006 finals) were ordered on the basis of results in the 2006 finals tournament.  This saw Iran move from fifth to third, and Japan and Saudi Arabia ranked equal fourth.

The four seeding Pots used were:

Groups 
The teams in each group played each other twice, once home and once away. The teams that finished first and second in their group qualified for the fourth round.

Group 1 

On 26 May 2008, FIFA decided to suspend Iraq from all international competitions after the Iraq Football Association was disbanded by the government on 20 May 2008. The suspension was provisionally and conditionally lifted on 29 May 2008.

Qatar fielded ineligible player Emerson in the 2–0 defeat to Iraq on 26 March 2008, prompting FIFA to controversially suspend him but clear Qatar of any wrongdoing, in direct contradiction to its decisions against Singapore.

Iraq appealed the decision to the Court of Arbitration for Sport but it was rejected by the CAS, saying that Iraq submitted documents and appeal fees too late.

Group 2

Group 3

Group 4

Group 5

Fourth round 

In the fourth round, the 10 remaining teams were drawn into 2 groups of 5 teams.

Qualified teams 

* Positions based on original final standings

Seeding 
The 10 qualifiers were drawn into two groups of five teams at the draw in Kuala Lumpur, Malaysia on 27 June 2008. The seeding for the fourth round was based on that used in the third round draw, but Saudi Arabia and Japan (seeded equal 4th in that draw) were separated by a random selection held at the start of the fourth round draw.

The top 6 ranked qualifiers were split into 3 pots of 2 teams, with the bottom 4 ranked nations grouped together in a separate pot.  Each group was allocated 1 team from each of Pots 1, 2 and 3, and 2 teams from Pot 4.

Groups 
The teams in each group played each other twice, once home and once away. The top 2 teams in each group qualified for the 2010 FIFA World Cup Finals in South Africa. The third-placed teams met in a play-off to determine who would play the OFC winner, New Zealand, in a separate playoff for a spot in the Finals.

Group A

Group B

Fifth round

Teams finishing 3rd in the fourth round groups played each other to determine a possible 5th qualifier from Asia. The draw for the order in which the two matches would be played was held on 2 June 2009 during the FIFA Congress in Nassau, the Bahamas.

|}

Bahrain advanced to the Asia-Oceania play-off on the away goals rule.

Inter-confederation play-offs

The Fifth Round winner then played the winner of the OFC qualifying group, New Zealand, in a home-and-away play-off. The winner of this play-off qualified for the 2010 FIFA World Cup finals.

The draw for the order in which the two matches would be played was held on 2 June 2009 during the FIFA Congress in Nassau, the Bahamas.

Qualified teams
The following four teams from AFC qualified for the final tournament.

1 Bold indicates champions for that year. Italic indicates hosts for that year.

Goalscorers 
There were 374 goals scored in 145 games (including 2 international play-offs), for an average of 2.58 goals per game.

8 goals

 Sarayoot Chaikamdee
 Maksim Shatskikh

6 goals

 Ahmad Ajab
 Ismail Matar

5 goals

 Mohammed Ghaddar
 Sebastián Soria
 Park Ji-Sung
 Zyad Chaabo

4 goals

 Tim Cahill
 Brett Emerton
 Cheng Siu Wai
 Javad Nekounam
 Mahdi Karim
 Hassan Abdel Fattah
 Hong Yong-Jo
 Jong Chol-Min
 Abdoh Otaif
 Aleksandar Đurić
 Park Chu-Young
 Jehad Al-Hussain
 Raja Rafe
 Numondzhon Khakimov
 Server Djeparov

3 goals

 Joshua Kennedy
 Harry Kewell
 Mahmood Abdulrahman
 A'ala Hubail
 Salman Isa
 Chan Siu Ki
 Emad Mohammed
 Yasuhito Endō
 Shunsuke Nakamura
 Yuji Nakazawa
 Marcus Tulio Tanaka
 Pak Chol-Min
 Sayed Ali Bechir
 Yasser Al-Qahtani
 Malek Mouath
 Redha Tukar
 John Wilkinson
 Kim Do-Heon
 Lee Keun-Ho
 Mohamed Al Zeno
 Datsakorn Thonglao
 Teeratep Winothai
 Ary
 Mohamed Al-Shehhi
 Odil Ahmedov
 Timur Kapadze
 Farhod Tadjiyev

2 goals

 Mark Bresciano
 Faouzi Aaish
 Ismail Abdullatif
 Abdulla Baba Fatadi
 Jaycee John Okwunwanne
 Liu Jian
 Qu Bo
 Sunil Chhetri
 Gholamreza Rezaei
 Masoud Shojaei
 Nashat Akram
 Kengo Nakamura
 Yoshito Ōkubo
 Keiji Tamada
 Mahmoud El Ali
 Kin Seng Chan
 Choe Kum-Chol
 Mun In-Guk
 Ismail Sulaiman Al Ajmi
 Amad Al Hosni
 Fábio César Montezine
 Ahmed Al-Fraidi
 Saad Al-Harthi
 Osama Hawsawi
 Naif Hazazi
 Shi Jiayi
 Mohd Noh Alam Shah
 Ki Sung-Yueng
 Kwak Tae-Hwi
 Seol Ki-Hyeon
 Firas Al-Khatib
 Feras Esmaeel
 Teerasil Dangda
 Artur Gevorkyan
 Mamedaly Karadanov
 Mekan Nasyrov
 Basheer Saeed
 Victor Karpenko

1 goal

 Obaidullah Karimi
 David Carney
 Scott Chipperfield
 Mile Sterjovski
 Sayed Mohamed Adnan
 Zumratul Hossain Mithu
 Samel Nasa
 Du Zhenyu
 Li Jinyu
 Wu Wei'an
 Li Weifang
 Sun Xiang
 Yang Lin
 Zhang Yaokun
 Zheng Bin
 Zheng Zhi
 Cheung Sai Ho
 Lam Ka Wai
 Lo Kwan Yee
 Steven Dias
 Budi Sudarsono
 Karim Bagheri
 Jalal Hosseini
 Ali Karimi
 Mohsen Khalili
 Mehdi Mahdavikia
 Alireza Vahedi Nikbakht
 Ferydoon Zandi
 Jassim Mohammed Ghulam
 Hawar Mulla Mohammed
 Seiichiro Maki
 Shinji Okazaki
 Tatsuya Tanaka
 Atsuto Uchida
 Waseem Al-Bzour
 Hatem Aqel
 Thaer Bawab
 Mahmoud Shelbaieh
 Fahad Al-Rashidi
 Aibek Bokoyev
 Cholponbek Esenkul Uulu
 Roda Antar
 Mohd Bunyamin Omar
 Ali Ashfaq
 Shamveel Qasim
 Donorovyn Lkhümbengarav
 Odkhuu Selenge
 An Chol-Hyok
 Jon Kwang-Ik
 Jong Tae-Se
 Kim Kuk-Jin
 Pak Nam-Chol
 Mohamed Al Hinai
 Ahmed Mubarak Al Mahaijri
 Fawzi Bashir
 Hassan Mudhafar
 Hashim Saleh
 Ali Afif
 Talal Al-Bloushi
 Saad Al-Shammari
 Khalfan Ibrahim
 Magid Mohamed
 Majdi Siddiq
 Hamad Al-Montashari
 Osama Al-Muwallad
 Nasser Al-Shamrani
 Mustafic Fahrudin
 Fazrul Nawaz
 Kim Chi-Woo
 Maher Al Sayed
 Aatef Jenyat
 Sanharib Malki
 Jamshed Ismailov
 Dzhomikhon Mukhiddinov
 Dilshod Vasiev
 Patiparn Phetphun
 Totchtawan Sripan
 Suree Sukha
 Nirut Surasiang
 Wladimir Baýramow
 Arif Mirzoyev
 Guvanch Ovekov
 Saif Mohammed Al Bishr
 Nawaf Mubarak
 Ismail Al Hammadi
 Saeed Al-Kas
 Ahmed Mohammed Al-Mahri
 Abdulrahim Jumaa
 Faisal Khalil
 Subait Khater
 Ulugbek Bakayev
 Vitaliy Denisov
 Alexander Geynrikh
 Aziz Ibrahimov
 Islom Inomov
 Shavkat Salomov
 Anvarjon Soliev
 Ilhomjon Suyunov
 Fekri Al-Hubaishi
 Ali Al Nono
 Mohammed Salem
 Haitham Thabit

1 own goal

 Marcus Tulio Tanaka (playing against Bahrain)
 Ramez Dayoub (playing against Singapore)
 Ahmed Faris Al-Binali (playing against Japan)
 Baihakki Khaizan (playing against Lebanon)
 Anas Al Khouja (playing against Kuwait)
 Alfredo Esteves (playing against Hong Kong)
 Fares Juma (playing against Saudi Arabia)

References

External links
AFC Qualification 2010 Official Website
Asian zone at FIFA.com

 

 
AFC
FIFA World Cup qualification (AFC)